Chandanvelly is a village and panchayat in Ranga Reddy district, Telangana, India. It falls under Shabad mandal. Chandanvelly, adjoining Sitarampur, and Hayathabad near Hyderabad will become Telangana's largest industrial cluster in future. Microsoft has acquired 52 acres in Chandanvelly to establish one of the three data centres in Hyderabad. Amazon is also planning to set up a data centre at Chandanvelly.

References

Villages in Ranga Reddy district